Bertel Ulrichsen (15 April 1901 – 25 February 1977) was a Norwegian footballer. He played in one match for the Norway national football team in 1923.

References

External links
 

1901 births
1977 deaths
Norwegian footballers
Norway international footballers
Association footballers not categorized by position